Liam King (born 1940) is an Irish retired hurler who played as a right corner-back for the Tipperary senior team.

King joined the team during the 1968 championship and was a regular member of the starting fifteen until his retirement after the 1975 championship. During that time he won one All-Ireland medal and one Munster medal. 

At club level King enjoyed a lengthy career with Lorrha–Dorrha.

References

1940 births
Living people
Lorrha-Dorrha hurlers
Tipperary inter-county hurlers
Munster inter-provincial hurlers
All-Ireland Senior Hurling Championship winners